The 1607th Air Transport Wing is an inactive United States Air Force unit.  Its last was assigned to the Eastern Transport Air Force, Military Air Transport Service, stationed at Dover Air Force Base, Delaware.  It was inactivated on 8 January 1966.

With the disestablishment of MATS, the assets of the Wing were reassigned to the 436th Military Airlift Wing, Military Airlift Command.

History
Following World War II, Dover Air Force Base was reactivated on 1 February 1951 and assigned under the jurisdiction of the Air Defense Command (ADC). At this time the 148th Fighter Interceptor Squadron (FIS) of the Pennsylvania Air National Guard (ANG) was recalled to active duty from Reading Air Force Base and assigned to Dover. On 1 February 1952, the 80th Air Base Squadron was activated at Dover to provide housekeeping duties for the four tenant units that had arrived on the base by that date. They were the 148th Fighter Interceptor Squadron, the 1737th Ferrying Squadron, Detachment 1909-6 Airways and Communications Services and Detachment 4, 9th Weather Group.

On 1 April 1952, the Military Air Transport Service (MATS) assumed command jurisdiction of the base. Concurrent with this action, the 80th Air Base Squadron was relieved of assignment to ADC and assigned to MATS, with further assignment to the Atlantic Division (MATS), headquartered at Westover AFB, Massachusetts; which in 1958, was re-designated as the Eastern Transport Air Force (EASTAF) and moved to McGuire Air Force Base, New Jersey. In addition, Congress appropriated $25 million to expand and transform Dover Air Force Base into a supplemental east coast port of embarkation for MATS and as a Foreign Clearing Base for ferrying flights headed to Europe, the Caribbean, and to the countries of the north.

On 1 August 1953, the 80th Air Base Squadron was inactivated and reverted to the control of the Department of the Air Force. Concurrent with this action, four units of the Atlantic Division were organized at Dover, the 1607th Air Base Group (ABG), the 1607th Air Base Squadron, the 1607th Maintenance and Supply Squadron and the 1607th Medical Squadron.

On 18 November 1953, the first two transport squadrons, the 1st Air Transport Squadron (ATS) and the 21st Air Transport Squadron (ATS), "Medium", which flew the Douglas C-54G, were reconstituted, re-designated and assigned to the 1607th Air Base Group. This would be the nucleus of the 1607th Air Transport Wing (ATW). On 22 December 1953, the Secretary of the Air Force designated Dover Air Force Base as a permanent military installation.

On 1 January 1954, the 1607th Air Transport Wing was designated, assigned to Atlantic Division MATS, and organized at Dover Air Force Base. By the same orders the 1607th Air Transport Group (ATG) was designated and organized in preparation for the start of transport mission operations from the base.

On 15 February 1954, the 39th, and the 45th Air Transport Squadrons, were reconstituted and assigned to the 1607th Air Transport Group. The 39th Air Transport Squadron was subsequently designated "Medium" and the 45th Air Transport Squadron was designated as a "Heavy" squadron, indicating the type of aircraft that was and would be assigned to these units. The initial transport mission of the newly activated Air Transport Group was accomplished when a C-54 operated by the 1st Air Transport Squadron (Medium) delivered a 9,000 pound radio mast to Harmon Field, Newfoundland. On 8 March 1954, the 40th Air Transport Squadron (Heavy) was reconstituted and assigned to the Wing. On 1 May 1954, the first Douglas C-124 Globemaster II arrived at Dover and on 12 June, the 45th Air Transport Squadron flew the first C-124 "heavy" transport mission, airlifting five engines to Harmon Field, Newfoundland and a 12,000 pound spool of cable to Torbay Air Base, Newfoundland.

On 8 September 1954, the 1st and 21st Air Transport Squadrons were re-designated from "Medium" to "Heavy" transport units, respectively as the C-54s assigned to these units were replaced with the C-124. On 20 September 1954, the 1607th Air Transport Wing and its headquarters were re-designated the 1607th Air Transport Wing (Heavy). The same order added "Heavy" to the designation of the 1607th Air Transport Group.

Throughout the years there were many changes to the organizations under the 1607th Air Transport Wing.  In 1955, C-124 units such as the 15th, the 20th and the 31st Air Transport Squadrons were relocated from Westover Air Force Base, Massachusetts when MATS closed its facilities there. Along with the relocation of these units both the 21st and 45th Air Transport Squadrons were inactivated. The 40th was inactivated in December 1960 and its personnel were absorbed into the other units. With the arrival of the Douglas C-133 Cargomaster in 1957, the 39th Air Transport Squadron was re-designated a C-133 unit with the 1st Air Transport Squadron to follow in 1960.

The most significant reorganization occurred on 18 January 1963, when the wing was reorganized under the MATS dual deputy concept of operations. This reorganization resulted in the discontinuance of the 1607th Air Transport Group (Heavy) and the 1607th Maintenance Group, transferring their responsibilities to a Deputy Commander for Operations (DCO), a Deputy Commander for Material (DCM) and the 1607th Air Base Group (ABG). In November 1964, the Secretary of Defense announced that eighty Department of Defense activities within the United States would be reduced or discontinued and that a troop carrier squadron would be transferred to Dover Air Force Base. Thus, in January 1965, the 15th Air Transport Squadron would inactivate along with the activation of the 9th Troop Carrier Squadron. Both the 20th and the 31st Air Transport Squadrons followed suit and were re-designated as troop carrier squadrons. This designation would be temporary for the 20th, as it would revert to its previous designation as a transport squadron. On 1 February 1965, MATS announced that Dover was selected as one of four bases where the Lockheed C-141 Starlifter would be tested under a program called "Lead the Force". The first C-141 arrived at Dover Air Force Base on 18 August 1965 and was assigned to the 20th Air Transport Squadron.

The initial mission of the 1607th Air Transport Wing (Heavy) was "to command, operate, administer and maintain Dover Air Force Base and such organizations, installations and facilities as may be assigned by proper authority for the purpose of transporting by air, personnel, material, mail, strategic materials and other cargoes for all agencies of the Department of Defense (DOD) and as authorized for other government agencies of the United States, subject to priorities and policies established by higher headquarters".

The mission responsibilities of the Wing were later expanded considerably. In the following years, the 1607th Air Transport Wing assumed the additional responsibility for logistical airlift operations including unit deployment, airdrop supply, air landed supply, scheduled and nonscheduled airlift, as well as joint airborne operations and training to include the capability for airdrop of personnel and cargo.

As a unit of the Military Air Transport Service, the 1607th Air Transport Wing had its share of responsibilities in major joint mobility exercises and global operations conducted during the "Cold War". Examples include: Big Slam/Puerto Pine, March 1960, was an exercise that deployed 22,000 combat Army troops and 12,000 tons of gear from stateside bases to Ramey AFB and Roosevelt Roads Naval Air Station, Puerto Rico; Check Mate II, September 1961, involved the deployment of the 101st Airborne Division from Fort Campbell, Kentucky to bases in Europe; Southern Express, October 1962, a NATO exercise which involved airlifting troops from central Europe to northern Greece; Big Lift, October 1963, the deployment of a full Army division from Texas to West Germany; The Cuban Missile Crisis, October 1962. In support of President John F. Kennedy's decision to blockade Cuba, Dover Air Force Base was called upon to support the build-up of forces in the southeastern United States. The Wing and its aircrews worked at peak capacity airlifting troops and supplies from bases throughout the country to Florida and Guantanamo Bay. History shows that we were within 36 hours of a nuclear confrontation with the Soviet Union; the Congo Airlift, also known as Operation "New Tape", was, at the time, history's longest lasting operational airlift, lasting  years, from 1960 to 1964; Operation Good Hope, September 1957, the airlift of arms support to Jordan. Forty vehicles equipped with 109 mm weapons were carried in five C-124s that flew in formation from Dhahran, Saudi Arabia to Amman, Jordan; Project ICE CUBE, May 1955, supported the construction of the Distant Early Warning Line in northern Canada; Polar Strike, January 1965, was conducted to evaluate U.S. STRICOM's ability to reinforce the Alaskan Command.

During the years what seemed impossible to many was considered routine day-to-day operations to the aircrews of the 1607th Air Transport Wing. In December 1958, a Dover AFB C-133 airlifted the heaviest load in the history of aviation when it carried 118,000 pounds of cargo to an altitude of 10,000 feet, breaking the former world record held by a Soviet Tupolev Tu-104 "Camel"; on 7 February 1960, a Dover C-124 with a 15th Air Transport Squadron aircrew flew a record breaking non-stop flight from Hickam AFB, Hawaii to Dover AFB in eighteen hours and forty minutes; a C-124 of the 1st Air Transport Squadron was assigned temporary duty to the 54th Air Rescue Squadron at Goose Bay, Labrador to aid in the rescue of 26 passengers and 8 crew members of a Norwegian vessel ice bound off the coast of Greenland; in March 1956, 22,000 pounds of emergency polio equipment and supplies were airlifted to Buenos Aires to help combat a polio outbreak; the AMIGO Airlift, mercy missions to Santiago, Chile in May 1960, when an earthquake literally re-made parts of that country; in 1962, the four-month round the world tour of John Glenn's space capsule Friendship 7 ; many re-supply missions from Thule Air Base, Greenland to the northernmost weather outposts at Nord, Greenland and Alert, both within just some 500 miles of the North Pole; the delivery of a telespectrograph to Ascension Island in support of the space project FIRE. It was the first time such an instrument was airlifted as a complete unit; the airlift of supplies and emergency equipment to Alaska after an earthquake struck that state in March 1964; the presidential support mission of John F. Kennedy, in July 1963, when he spoke the famous words "Ich Bin Ein Berliner", at the Berlin Wall. These are but a few of the approximate 75 significant events added to the normal day to day global airlift operations, of which the 1607th Air Transport Wing was involved. During its twelve-year history at Dover, the 1607th ATW accumulated 1,076,483 transport flying hours or an approximate equivalent distance of 235 million nautical miles.

The 1607th Air Transport Wing (Heavy) was assigned to the Military Air Transport Service (MATS) throughout its history and, on 8 January 1966, the 1607th was discontinued and the 436th Military Airlift Wing was activated when the Military Air Transport Service (MATS) was replaced by the Military Airlift Command (MAC).  The 1st, 20th, and 39th Air Transport Squadrons "Heavy" and the 9th and 31st Troop Carrier Squadrons "Heavy" were all re-designated as Military Airlift Squadrons.

There were 70 heavy transport aircraft assigned, on 8 January 1966, with over 8,000 military and civilian personnel. Its C-124 Globemasters, C-133 Cargomasters and the newly acquired C-141 Starlifters maintained a D-Day state of readiness to airlift men and material for the United States and allied military forces whenever and wherever needed. In addition, the Wing's mercy airlifts to nations suffering natural disasters, and its United Nations airlift effort in the Democratic Republic of the Congo and other areas of the world, bolstered US national policy in the Cold War.

Lineage
 Designated as the 1607th Air Transport Wing (Heavy) and activated on 1 February 1952
 Organized on 1 January 1954
 Discontinued on 8 January 1966

Components

Groups
 1607th Air Transport Group, 1 January 1954 – 18 January 1963

Squadrons
 1st Air Transport Squadron, 18 January 1963 – 8 January 1966
 39th Air Transport Squadron, 18 January 1963 – 8 January 1966
 15th Air Transport Squadron, 18 January 1963 – 1 January 1965
 20th Air Transport Squadron, 18 January 1963 – 8 January 1966
 31st Air Transport Squadron, 18 January 1963 – 8 January 1966
 9th Troop Carrier Squadron, 1 January 1965 – 8 January 1966

Stations
 Dover Air Force Base, Delaware, 1 January 1954 – 8 January 1966

Aircraft
 Douglas C-54 Skymaster, 1953–1957
 Douglas C-124C Globemaster II, 1954–1966
 Douglas C-133 Cargomaster, 1957–1966
 Lockheed C-141 Starlifter, 1965–1966
 Kaman HH-43B Huskie, 1960–1966

Commanders
 Col Paul A. Zartman, 1 Jan 1954 – 22 June 1954
 Col Alfred H. Dehle, 23 June 1954 – 27 Jul 1954
 Brig Gen Francis C. Gideon, 28 Jul 1954 – 25 Aug 1958
 Col Andrew B. Cannon, 26 Aug 1958 – 31 Aug 1958
 Brig Gen Robert J. Goewey, 1 Sep 1958 – 29 Aug 1960
 Col Whiteford C. Mauldin, 30 Aug 1960 – 30 Jun 1964
 Col David E. Daniel, 1 Jul 1964 – 6 Apr 1965
 Brig Gen John B. Wallace, 7 Apr 1965 – 8 Jan 1966

References

Notes

Bibliography

 
 Hist (U), 1607 OIS/HO, "January 1954 – December 1964, Compilation History, 1607th Air Transport Wing Heavy, Volume I", ca. 1965.
 Hist (U), 1607 OIS/HO, "January – June 1965, Semi-Annual Periodic History, 1607th Air Transport Wing Heavy, Volume I", ca. 1965.
 Hist (U), 1607 OIS/HO, "July – December 1965, Semi-Annual Periodic History, 1607th Air Transport Wing Heavy, Volume I", ca. 1966.
 Paper (U), USAF AETC AFHRA/RSO, "Lineage and Honors of the 1607th Air Transport Wing", 12 July 2000.
 Archives, Air Mobility Command Museum.
 USAFHRA search 1607th Air Transport

Air transport wings of the United States Air Force
Four Digit Wings of the United States Air Force
Military units and formations established in 1953
Military units and formations disestablished in 1966